The 1934 Detroit Titans football team represented the University of Detroit in the 1934 college football season. Detroit outscored its opponents by a combined total of 112 to 59 and finished with a 5–3–1 record in its 10th year under head coach and College Football Hall of Fame inductee, Gus Dorais.

Schedule

References

External links
 1934 University of Detroit football programs

Detroit
Detroit Titans football seasons
Detroit Titans football
Detroit Titans football